The Ski Arlberg ski area is situated in the Arlberg massif in the states of Vorarlberg and Tyrol (Austria). 

Since the winter of 2013–14, the villages of Lech, Oberlech, Zürs and Zug have been linked to the Warth-Schröcken ski area which makes Ski Arlberg the largest connected ski area in Austria.

Geography 
Since 2013, the ski resort includes the villages of Klösterle, Lech, Oberlech, Schröcken, St. Anton am Arlberg, St. Christoph am Arlberg, Stuben, Stubenbach, Warth, Zürs and Zug.

The ski area consists of two parts, namely:

 Arlberg Ost/East (St. Anton, St. Christoph and Stuben) 
 Arlberg West (Lech, Oberlech, Warth, Schröcken and Zürs)

The highest elevation of the ski area is the top of the Valluga mountain at 2,811 m above sea level in St. Anton.

History 
In 1884, Emperor Franz Joseph I opened the Arlbergbahn and made it possible for skiers to get to the Arlberg. The Arlberg Ski Club was founded in 1901, and in 1936 Austria's first tow lift was put into operation in Zürs.

Since the 2013/14 season, Lech has been connected to Schröcken by the 10-person-gondola Auenfeldjet which makes Ski Arlberg the largest connected ski area in Austria and one of the five largest in the world. In the 2016/17 season, the 10-person-gondola Flexenbahn between the Arlberg East and West areas was opened.

Lift system 

The ski area has a rich lift system consisting of a variety of aerial and surface lifts including 15 cable cars (cable cars, gondolas and funitels), 45 chairlifts (14 2-person lifts, one 3-person lift, 13 4-person lifts, 16 6-person and one 8-person lift) as well as 28 drag lifts.
A remarkable lift is the Weibermahd which is a combination lift, meaning that 8-person chairlifts and 10-person gondolas alternate on the same rope. It is the first combination lift installed in Vorarlberg and was manufactured by the Austrian-Swiss company Doppelmayr.

St. Anton – St. Christoph – Stuben 

 Albonabahn I (2-person chairlift)
 Albonabahn II (gondola)
 Albonagratbahn (2-person chairlift)
 Angerlift (drag lift)
 Arlenmähderbahn (6-person chairlift)
 Fangbahn (4-person chairlift)
 Galzigbahn (funitel)
 Gampbergbahn (6-person chairlift)
 Gampenbahn (4-person chairlift)
 Kapallbahn (6-person chairlift)
 Kindlisfeldlift (drag lift)
 Maassbahn (2-person chairlift)
 Maienseelift I (drag lift)
 Maienseelift II (drag lift)
 Mattunbahn (4-person chairlift)
 Muldenlift (drag lift)
 Nasserein-Kinderpark (practicing drag lift)
 Nassereinbahn (gondola)
 Nassereinlift (drag lift)
 Osthangbahn (4-person chairlift)
 Rauzlift (drag lift)
 Rendlbahn (gondola)
 Riffelbahn I (2-person chairlift)
 Riffelbahn II (2-person chairlift)
 Salzbödenlift (drag lift)
 Schindlergratbahn (3-person chairlift)
 Schöngrabenlift (drag lift)
 St. Christophbahn (4-person chairlift)
 Tanzbödenbahn (6-person chairlift)
 St. Christoph (practicing drag lift)
 Valfagehrbahn (6-person chairlift)
 Vallugabahn I (cable car)
 Vallugabahn II (cable car)
 Vallugalift (drag lift)
 Walchlift (drag lift)
 Zammermoosbahn (4-person chairlift)
 Gampen I (practicing drag lift)
 Gampen II (practicing drag lift)

Lech – Oberlech – Zürs 

 Auenfeldjet (gondola)
 Babylift Berghof (drag lift)
 Babylift Zürs (drag lift)
 Balmengrat (drag lift)
 Bergbahn Oberlech (cable car)
 Flexenbahn (gondola)
 Hasensprung (6-person chairlift)
 Hexenboden (6-person chairlift)
 Hinterwies (drag lift)
 Kriegerhorn (6-person chairlift)
 Madlochbahn (2-person chairlift)
 Muggengrat (6-person chairlift)
 Petersbodenbahn (6-person chairlift)
 Rotschrofen (2-person chairlift)
 Rüfikopfbahn I (cable car)
 Rüfikopf II (cable car)
 Schafalp (drag lift)
 Schlegelkopf (2-person chairlift)
 Schlegelkopf (4-person chairlift)
 Schlosskopf (2-person chairlift)
 Schüttboden (drag lift)
 Seekopf (4-person chairlift)
 Ski school lift (drag lift)
 Steinmähder (8-person chairlift)
 Superbaby (drag lift)
 Trittalp (6-person chairlift)
 Trittkopfbahn I (gondola)
 Trittkopfbahn II (gondola)
 Weibermahd (combination lift)
 Zugerberg (2-person chairlift)
 Zürsersee (4-person chairlift)
 Practicing slope (6-person chairlift)
 Practicing lift Flühen (drag lift)
 Practicing lift Oberlech (drag lift)
 Practicing lift Schwarzwand (drag lift)

Warth – Schröcken 

 Dorfbahn Warth (gondola)
 Hochalpbahn (4-person chairlift)
 Jägeralp-Express (6-person chairlift)
 Karhornbahn (2-person chairlift)
 Kitzeliftle (drag lift)
 Kuchlbahn (2-person chairlift)
 Körbliftle (drag lift)
 Salober-Jet (6-person chairlift)
 Skischaukel Falken-Körbersee (2-person chairlift)
 Skischaukel Falken-Spielboden (2-person chairlift)
 Sonnen-Jet (6-person chairlift)
 Sonnencruiser (4-person chairlift)
 Steffisalp-Express (4-person chairlift)
 Wannenkopfbahn (4-person chairlift)
 Wartherhorn-Express (6-person chairlift)

The White Ring

The White Ring (German: Der Weiße Ring) is one of the longest ski circuits in the world (22 km). It comprises five downhill runs, five ropeways, an intensive ascent and a backcountry ski run and 5,500 metres of altitude difference.

For the 50th anniversary of the ski circuit, the first White Ring ski race was held in the 2005–06 season. The course record is 44:10:75 minutes and held since 2010 by Markus Weiskopf.

FIS Alpine Ski World Cup 
The Ski Arlberg ski resort has been the venue for numerous World Cup ski races in the past, including the following:

 January 1988: super-G (women), winner: Zoe Haas (SUI)
 November 1991: 2 slalom races (women), winners: Vreni Schneider (SUI) and Bianca Fernández Ochoa (SPA)
 January 1993: slalom (men), winner: Thomas Fogdö (SWE)
 January 1993: combination (men), winner: Marc Girardelli (LUX)
 December 1993: super-G (men), winner: Hannes Trinkl (AUT)
 December 1994: 2 slalom races (men), winner (both): Alberto Tomba (IT)

After 26 years, alpine ski races will be held again in the Lech-Zürs area in November 2020. The races will take place on November 14 and 15 in the Flexenarena Zürs under the name "Flexenrace". They will consist of parallel ski races for men and women, as well as a mixed team event. Additionally, there will be a combination ski race with a slalom and a super-G in St. Anton am Arlberg on the 9th and 10 January 2021.

References

External links 
 Official website
 List of Ski Arlberg ski slopes and current weather conditions

Ski areas in Austria
Sport in Vorarlberg
Sports venues in Austria
Skiing in Austria
Ski areas and resorts in Austria